Events in the year 1393 in Japan.

Incumbents
Monarch: Go-Komatsu

Deaths
January 11 - Emperor Go-En'yū (b. 1359)

References

 
 
Japan
Years of the 14th century in Japan